There are presently 16 licensed radio stations in the Cayman Islands authorized by the Information and Communication Technology Authority, or ICTA.

Radio stations on Grand Cayman 
87.9 FM ZFKP-FM - Praise 87.9 - OWNER: C.I. Conference of Seventh-Day Adventists
89.9 FM ZFKC-FM - Radio Cayman 1 - OWNER: Government
92.7 FM ZFST-FM - STAR 92.7 - OWNER: Interactive Broadcasting & Media Ltd
94.9 FM ZFBB-FM - 94.9 GOLD (was BOB FM) - OWNER: Hurley's Media Ltd.
95.5 FM ZFKO-FM - Big Fish Radio - OWNER: Big Fish Radio
96.5 FM ZFKS-FM - 96.5 CayRock - OWNER: dms Broadcasting Limited
98.9 FM ZFIR-FM - 98.9 IRIE FM - OWNER: Hurley's Media Ltd.
99.9 FM ZFZZ-FM - Z99 - OWNER: Hurley's Media Ltd.
101.1 FM ZFKI-FM - ICCI-FM - OWNER: International College of the Cayman Islands
101.9 FM ZFKY-FM - Rooster 101.9  - OWNER: Hurley's Media Ltd.
103.1 FM ZFLV-FM - Love FM - OWNER: Cayman Broadcasting Ltd.
104.1 FM ZFKH-FM - Hot 104.1 - OWNER: dms Broadcasting Limited
105.3 FM ZFKZ-FM - Breeze FM (aka "Radio Cayman 2") - OWNER: Government
106.1 FM ZFKK-FM - 106.1 Kiss FM - OWNER: dms Broadcasting Limited
107.1 FM ZFKX-FM - x107.1 - OWNER: dms Broadcasting Limited
107.9 FM ZFGT-FM - Sunny 107.9 Weatheradio and traffic - OWNER: Government

Defunct stations
88.7 FM ZFKG-FM - Gospel 88 - OWNER: Christian Communications Association
94.3 FM ZFKW-FM - WestPoint Radio - OWNER: WestPoint Radio & Family Chapel Ltd.
94.9 FM BOB FM - OWNER: Hurley's Media
95.5 FM Ocean FM - OWNER: Cerentis Broadcasting Systems
96.5 FM Style 96.5 (evolved into today's ZFKS-FM 96.5 Cay Rock)
97.7 FM ZFHE-FM - Heaven 97 - OWNER: Christian Communications Association

Radio stations on Cayman Brac 
91.9 FM ZFBZ-FM - Breeze FM (Radio Cayman 2) - OWNER: Government
93.9 FM ZFKB-FM - Radio Cayman 1 - OWNER: Government
96.5 FM ZFKS-FM - 96.5 CayRock - OWNER: dms Broadcasting Limited
101.9 FM ZFRS-FM - Rooster 101 - OWNER: Hurley's

Radio stations on Little Cayman 
91.9 FM ZFBZ-FM-1 - Breeze FM (Radio Cayman 2) - OWNER: Government
93.9 FM ZFKL-FM - Radio Cayman 1 - OWNER: Government
96.5 FM ZFKS-FM - 96.5 CayRock - OWNER: dms Broadcasting Limited
101.9 FM ZFRS-FM-1 - Rooster 101 - OWNER: Hurley's

See also 
Cayman Islands
British West Indies

References 

 
Radio stations